Kim Børgesen (born 13 December 1945) is a Danish rower. He competed in the men's single sculls event at the 1972 Summer Olympics.

References

1945 births
Living people
Danish male rowers
Olympic rowers of Denmark
Rowers at the 1972 Summer Olympics
Place of birth missing (living people)